Ambad is a town with a municipal council in Jalna district  in the state of Maharashtra, India. Ambad is notable for its temple dedicated to the Hindu goddess Matsyodari. In October of each year, devotees of the goddess gather in Ambad for the Hindu festival of Dashahara. A local tradition claims that the name "Ambad" was given to this city by a Hindu Raja named Ambarisha. According to this tradition, Raja Ambarisha would worship the goddess on a rock hill which resembled a fish. Because of this fish-shaped rock hill, the goddess was named Matsyodari ("in the stomach of fish").  The temple was constructed by Ahilya Devi Holkar, who also has developed Ambad by constructing Pushkarini and Kavandi (water reservoirs). Ambad is the second most populous town in district of Jalna. Ambad also has a Government Polytechnic College which is one of the only two Government Polytechnic Colleges located in Jalna district along with Government Polytechnic, Jalna. Ambad municipal council is convened at Court Road.

Ambad is also famous for its "Dattajayanti Sangeet Mahotsav" celebrations. The festival was started in 1923 by Pandit Bappasaheb Jalgaonkar. His son the Pandit Govindrao Jalgaonkar continued the tradition and gave it a broader appeal among masses. The festival is purely based on Indian classical music.

In middle of city there's old Shree Ram Mandir Temple .Shree Ram Mandir, a beautiful, delicate, charming, mind-pleasing idol of Lord Rama was established in the 18th century by saint  devotee Sri Ramanand Maharaj of Gondi. From the 18th century till today, the service and worship of Lord Rama continues regularly.

Villages and cities near Ambad

Jalna
Pachod
Ghansawangi
Tirthpuri
Shahagad
Kumbhar Pimpalgaon
Paithan
Aurangabad
Rajur
Osmanabad
Parbhani
Pune
Mumbai
Ahmednagar
Solapur
Ajanta Caves
Lonar Lake

Nearby Railway Station
Jalna (J) is nearest railway station to Ambad.
Partur (J) Railway Station to Ambad

Nearby Airport

Health Services 
Ambad City is home to a variety of medical facilities and hospitals, which are frequented by individuals from surrounding villages seeking medical treatment. A few of these establishments are listed below.

 Government Hospital Ambad
 Matsyodari Clinic Ambad (Near Bus Stand)

Education
Ambad has almost all type of well known educational institutions. Which includes, Engineering, Pharmacy, Education (D.Ed & B.Ed), I.T.I., English medium schools and also colleges of arts, science, Computer, Management & Nursing. Some of them are mentioned below:
Government Polytechnic College
Ismail Mehta College of Pharmacy
Zilla Parishad School
Matsyodari College
Dattaji Bhale Primary School
Dattaji Bhale secondary School
Omshanti Vidyalaya
Jain English School
R.P. International School
Matsyodari High School
Little Champ English School
Godavari College
CSK Jain English School
Shree Ram Mandir

Location

Geography

Demographics
 India census, Ambad had a population of 80,321. Males constitute 53% of the population, and females 47%. Ambad has an average literacy rate of 65%, which is higher than the national average of 59.5%.  15% of the population is under 6 years of age.

References

Cities and towns in Jalna district
Talukas in Maharashtra